George Clifton Edwards Jr. (August 6, 1914 – April 8, 1995) was a justice of the Michigan Supreme Court and a United States circuit judge of the United States Court of Appeals for the Sixth Circuit.

Education and career
Born in Dallas, Texas, Edwards received a Bachelor of Arts degree from Southern Methodist University in 1933 and a Master of Arts from Harvard University in 1934. Edwards moved to Detroit, Michigan, in 1936 and became a United Automobile Workers union organizer. In 1939, Edwards was appointed director-secretary of the Detroit Housing Commission by Mayor Edward Jeffries. He was elected to the Detroit Common Council in 1941 at the age of 25. He was in the United States Army during World War II, from 1943 to 1946, primarily stationed in the Philippines, where he became a 2nd Lieutenant.

He received a Certificate of Completion from Detroit College of Law (now Michigan State University College of Law) in 1944, and a Juris Doctor from the same institution in 1949. Upon return from army duty, Edwards began his law practice and also returned to the common council and was elected president of the council that year. In 1949, Edwards ran for Mayor of Detroit but lost to Albert Cobo in a racially charged election in which Edwards stood up for equal rights for blacks and the protection of individual civil rights. Edwards continued serving as President of the Detroit Common Council from 1946 to 1950, and was also Chairman of the Detroit Election Commission from 1946 to 1950.

State judicial service

In 1951, Governor G. Mennen Williams appointed Edwards as probate judge of the Wayne County Juvenile Court. In 1954, he was elected to the Wayne County Circuit Court. In 1956, he was appointed to the Michigan Supreme Court to fill a vacancy, and was subsequently elected to this court for two more terms, serving until 1961. Edwards resigned from the Michigan Supreme Court in 1962 when he was appointed Detroit Police commissioner by Mayor Jerome Cavanagh, in hopes that he could help ease the racial troubles in the city.

Federal judicial service

On September 9, 1963, Edwards was nominated by President John F. Kennedy to a seat on the United States Court of Appeals for the Sixth Circuit vacated by Judge Thomas Francis McAllister. His confirmation hearing in the United States Senate commenced the day before President Kennedy was assassinated. Edwards was confirmed on December 16, 1963, over the objections of the Director of the Federal Bureau of Investigation, J. Edgar Hoover. Edwards received his commission on December 19, 1963, from President Lyndon B. Johnson. He served as Chief Judge from January 16, 1979, to September 30, 1983, assuming senior status on January 15, 1985. Edwards served in that capacity until his death on April 8, 1995, in Cincinnati, Ohio.

Writing credits

Edwards wrote Pioneer at Law: A Legacy in Pursuit of Justice, a biography of his father, George C. Edwards, a lawyer and activist on behalf of labor unions, the poor, and African Americans, in Dallas, Texas, during the first half of the 20th century, and an autobiographical account of his own early life; it was published in 1974.

References

Sources
 
 bio of Edwards
 Edwards 6th circuit page
 Pioneer At Law book review
 Bridging the river of Hatred: The Pioneering Efforts of Detroit Police Commissioner George Edwards

1914 births
1995 deaths
Lawyers from Dallas
Southern Methodist University alumni
Harvard University alumni
Detroit College of Law alumni
Justices of the Michigan Supreme Court
Judges of the United States Court of Appeals for the Sixth Circuit
United States court of appeals judges appointed by Lyndon B. Johnson
20th-century American judges
20th-century American politicians
United States Army officers
Detroit City Council members
Writers from Michigan
Writers from Texas
Detroit Police Department chiefs